Henry Odia (born 5 September 1990) is a Nigerian football player who currently plays for FC Dacia Chișinău.

Club statistics

Updated to games played as of 5 December 2012.

References
HLSZ

1990 births
Living people
Nigerian footballers
Association football midfielders
Budapest Honvéd FC players
FC Dacia Chișinău players
Nemzeti Bajnokság I players
Nigerian expatriate footballers
Expatriate footballers in Hungary
Expatriate footballers in Moldova
Nigerian expatriate sportspeople in Hungary
Nigerian expatriate sportspeople in Moldova
Sportspeople from Benin City